Lioness is a Canadian indie rock dance band formed in January 2007 in Toronto, Ontario, Canada.

History
The band was formed by Ronnie Morris and Jeff Scheven, former rhythm section of controller.controller (Paper Bag Records) and No Dynamics' vocalist Vanessa Magic. Lioness released their debut self-titled EP, Lioness on October 21, 2008 on New Romantic.

Playing in low-key after-hours sets in off-the-radar locales in Toronto has led to supporting appearances with Hercules and Love Affair, !!!, You Say Party! We Say Die! and k-os.

Their sound combines dark disco grooves of Scheven's heavy drumming with Morris' unique bass sound and is conspicuous for its lack of guitars. Magic draws upon jazz, old soul and blues, roaring over layers of electronic squall. On stage, they are a synthesis of electronic rock band and performance art project, a drum and bass wall of sound bathed in red light.

In 2009, Lioness took part in an interactive documentary series called City Sonic.  The series, which featured 20 Toronto artists, had them talk about Toronto’s Masonic Temple and the band's attraction to the mystery of the Freemasons.

Members

Current
Vanessa Magic (2007–present)
Ronnie Morris (2007–present)
Jeff Scheven (2007–present)

Discography
 Lioness EP, 2008
 Omens, Oracles & Signs - Vol. 1, 2009
 Omens, Oracles & Signs - Vol. 2, 2010
 The Golden Killer, 2012

See also

Music of Canada
Canadian rock
List of Canadian musicians
List of bands from Canada
:Category:Canadian musical groups

References

External links
 Lioness Myspace
 New Romantic

Musical groups established in 2007
Canadian indie rock groups
Musical groups from Toronto
2007 establishments in Ontario